The Timok Valley is a geographical region in east-central Serbia around the Timok River. The Timok Valley corresponds to parts of two Serbian districts (Bor and Zaječar), with a total 2002 census population of 284,112.

Name
The Serbian name is derived from the hydronym Timok and krajina ("frontier, march"), named such due to its location and history as a borderland. It was introduced in the Interwar period as denoting the Timok confluence with the Negotin Valley and Ključ, which are part of the Timok Valley. The term has no historical or geographical basis. In Romanian, the term "Timoc Valley" is used for the area inhabited by the Romanian-speaking Vlachs. "Tribalia" is also used in Romanian. The region was sometimes known as Podunavia in Medieval times.

Geography
The Timok Valley roughly corresponds to the Bor and Zaječar districts of Serbia. It includes six municipalities and two cities: 
Zaječar – 66,000
Bor – 44,000
Negotin – 37,000
Knjaževac – 32,000
Sokobanja – 19,000
Kladovo – 21,000
Boljevac – 15,000
Majdanpek – 20,000

The largest city in the region is Zaječar, and therefore functions as its cultural, urban, and economic centre. It consists of four municipalities: Stari grad (old parts of the city: Vlačić, Kraljevica, Karađorđev venac, Šljivarsko brdo, Lubničko brdo, Oskoruša, Pazaršte, Zvezdan, Podliv, Veliki izvor), Kotlujevac (Ključ 1,2,3,4, Živinarnik, Selište, Vlaško brdo, Beli breg), Grljan (south suburban parts and Višnjar) and Salaš (north suburban parts). The largest municipality is Koltlujevac, with a population of over 25,000.

Climate
Zaječar, the biggest city in the region, has a humid continental climate (Köppen climate classification: Dfa), bordering on a humid subtropical climate (Köppen climate classification: Cfa).

History
Early Bronze Age pottery of the Kostolac-Kocofeni culture has been found throughout the region. During the Roman era, the area was administratively part of the Dacia Ripensis. During emperor Justinian's reign there were numerous fortifications in the area. Notable Roman sites include Timacum Minus, Trajan's Bridge, Diana Fortress, and others.
The Bulgarian ruler Ivan Stratsimir (Vidin principate) and Wallachian Voivode Mircea the Elder controlled the territory of Podunavia until the Ottoman conquest in the 14th century. Several settlements in the region received Habsburg monarchy frontier status after the Treaty of Passarowitz (1718); the area became a frontier towards the Ottoman Empire.

A peasant uprising took place in 1883 in the Timok Valley, in Eastern Serbia, known as the Timok Rebellion. The peasant movement of 1883 resulted from economic, political and social factors.

Between 1918 and 1922, two districts of the Kingdom of Serbs, Croats and Slovenes existed in the area – Krajina District, with seat in Negotin, and Timok District with seat in Zaječar. In 1922, these two districts were merged into the newly formed Timok Oblast with seat in Zaječar. Timok Oblast existed until 1929 when it was included into the newly formed Morava Banovina with seat in Niš. At present there are two districts in the area: Bor District with seat in Bor; and Zaječar District with seat in Zaječar.

Culture

Ethnic groups

 
The region is inhabited by a majority of Serbs and minority of Romanians/Vlachs. Based on the 2002 census and results in the Bor and Zaječar Districts (which together had 284,112 inhabitants), there were 85,58% Serbs, 8,31% Vlachs and 0,96% Romani. The Serb community traditionally speak the Kosovo–Resava dialect in the north and the Prizren-Timok dialect in the south, however, Standard Serbian is used in formal communication. The Vlachs speak a variety of two dialects (Banat and Oltenian dialects) of the Romanian language, which awaits standardization into a hypothetical new language for the Vlachs. Both Serbs and Vlachs are Eastern Orthodox by denomination. There is currently controversy regarding the ethnic identification of the Vlach community and whether they are Romanians or not.

Gallery

References

Sources

External links

 
Geographical regions of Serbia
Geography of Southern and Eastern Serbia